This is a list of investigational obsessive–compulsive disorder drugs, or drugs that are currently under development for clinical use in the treatment of obsessive–compulsive disorder (OCD) but are not yet approved. Chemical/generic names are listed first, with developmental code names, synonyms, and brand names in parentheses.

Under development

Actively under development
 Immunoglobulin (immune globulin 10%, 10% high purity immunoglobulin, 10% IVIG, NewGam, Newnorm, Octagam 10%, Octagam, Panzyga) – immunoglobulin / immunostimulant 
 Troriluzole (BHV-4157, BHV-4157a, FC-4157; trigriluzole) – prodrug of riluzole / glutamate modulator

Preclinical development
 Cannabis extracts (various) – cannabinoid receptor modulators

No development reported
 4'-Fluorocannabidiol (4'-F-CBD; fluorinated cannabidiol; HUF-101, HUF-102, HUF-103) – cannabinoid receptor modulator, other actions 
 AbbVie/Rugen research programme – unspecified mechanism of action 
 Agomelatine (Alodil, Melitor, Thymanax, Valdoxan, Vestin; AGO-178, AGO178C, S-20098, S-20098-F55) – serotonin 5-HT2C receptor antagonist and melatonin receptor agonist 
 CR-5542 – orexin receptor antagonist 
 Dual SSRIs and serotonin 5-HT1A receptor agonists (SSA-426, WAY-163426, WAY-211612, WAY-253752, WAY-426) 
 Risperidone (Risperdal, Risperdal Consta, Risperdal Depot; JNJ-410397-AAA, R-64766, R064766) – atypical antipsychotic / monoamine receptor modulator 
 Secretin (SecreFlo; INN-329, RG-1068) – hormone/diagnostic agent 
 Sosei Heptares research programme – various mechanisms of action

Not under development

Development discontinued
 Bitopertin (R-1678, RG-6718, RG1678, RO-4917838) – glycine GlyT1 inhibitors / glycine reuptake inhibitor 
 Cycloserine (D-cycloserine; TIK-101) – glutamate NMDA receptor partial agonist 
 Elzasonan (CP-448187, CP-448187-01) – serotonin 5-HT1B and 5-HT1D receptor antagonist
 F-14258 – serotonin 5-HT1B and 5-HT1D receptor antagonist
 Fluoxetine/naltrexone (OREX-004) – selective serotonin reuptake inhibitor and opioid receptor antagonist 
 Mavoglurant (AFQ-056) – glutamate mGlu5 receptor antagonist 
 NPL-2003 – glutamate modulator 
 Ondansetron (Setrodon; TO-2061) – serotonin 5-HT3 receptor antagonist 
 RO-600175 – serotonin 5-HT2C receptor agonist 
 Roxindole (EMD-49980) – dopamine receptor agonist, serotonin receptor modulator, adrenergic receptor modulator, and serotonin reuptake inhibitor 
 SB-200646 (SB-200646A) – serotonin 5-HT2B and 5-HT2C receptor antagonist

Formal development never or not yet started
 5-HT6 receptor agonists (e.g., WAY-181187, WAY-208466)
 Antiandrogens (e.g., flutamide, cyproterone acetate, triptorelin)
 Cannabinoids (e.g., nabilone, tetrahydrocannabinol (THC)/cannabis) – cannabinoid receptor modulators
 NMDA receptor modulators (e.g., ketamine, memantine, nitrous oxide, rapastinel)
 Nonsteroidal anti-inflammatory drugs (NSAIDs) (e.g., celecoxib, naproxen) – cyclooxygenase inhibitors
 Rituximab (Rituxan) – monoclonal antibody against CD20
 Serotonergic psychedelics (e.g., psilocybin/psilocybin mushrooms, lysergic acid diethylamide (LSD)) – serotonin receptor modulators
 Tolcapone (Tasmar) – catechol-O-methyltransferase inhibitor

Clinically used drugs

Approved drugs
 Clomipramine (Anafranil) – tricyclic antidepressant / monoamine reuptake inhibitor and receptor modulator 
 Escitalopram (S-citalopram; Cipralex, Entact, Lexapro, Seroplex, Sipralex, Sipralexa; LU-26054; MLD-55) – selective serotonin reuptake inhibitor 
 Fluoxetine (Prozac, Prozac Weekly, Reneuron, Sarafem; LY-110140) – selective serotonin reuptake inhibitor 
 Fluvoxamine (Depromel, Luvox, Luvox CR; SME-3110) – selective serotonin reuptake inhibitor and sigma-1 receptor agonist 
 Paroxetine (Aropax, Deroxat, Divarius, Dropax, Dropaxin, Frosinor, Motivan, Paxil, Paxil CR, Serestill, Seroxat, Tagonis; BRL-29060, BRL-29060A, FG-7051, NNC-207051, SI-211103) – selective serotonin reuptake inhibitor 
 Sertraline (Aremis, Besitran, Gladem, J Zoloft, Lustral, Serad, Serlain, Tatig, Zoloft; CP-51974, CP-51974-01) – selective serotonin reuptake inhibitor

Off-label drugs
 Atypical antipsychotics (e.g., aripiprazole, olanzapine, quetiapine, risperidone) – monoamine receptor modulators

See also
 List of investigational drugs

References

Further reading

External links
 AdisInsight - Springer

Obsessive-compulsive disorder drugs, investigational
Experimental drugs